Manahawkin is an unincorporated community and census-designated place (CDP) located within Stafford Township, in Ocean County, New Jersey, United States. As of the 2010 United States Census, the CDP's population was 2,303. Manahawkin has been thought to be a Lenape word meaning "land of good corn", although this has been disputed by recent scholars claiming that it translates to "fertile land sloping into the water."

Manahawkin is the gateway to the resort communities on Long Beach Island, with Route 72 providing the sole road access, ending in Ship Bottom as it crosses Manahawkin Bay via the Manahawkin Bay Bridge (formally known as the Dorland J. Henderson Memorial Bridge).

Geography
According to the United States Census Bureau, the CDP had a total area of 1.922 square miles (4.979 km2), including 1.827 square miles (4.731 km2) of it is land and 0.096 square miles (0.248 km2) of water (4.98%) is water.

Demographics

Census 2010

Census 2000
As of the 2000 United States Census there were 2,004 people, 757 households, and 555 families living in the CDP. The population density was 425.1/km2 (1,098.9/mi2). There were 827 housing units at an average density of 175.4/km2 (453.5/mi2). The racial makeup of the CDP was 96.86% White, 0.05% African American, 0.10% Native American, 1.45% Asian, 0.55% from other races, and 1.00% from two or more races. Hispanic or Latino of any race were 1.90% of the population.

There were 757 households, out of which 30.5% had children under the age of 18 living with them, 56.4% were married couples living together, 12.8% had a female householder with no husband present, and 26.6% were non-families. 21.7% of all households were made up of individuals, and 10.8% had someone living alone who was 65 years of age or older. The average household size was 2.56 and the average family size was 2.97.

In the CDP the population was spread out, with 22.9% under the age of 18, 6.9% from 18 to 24, 26.8% from 25 to 44, 25.6% from 45 to 64, and 17.8% who were 65 years of age or older. The median age was 41 years. For every 100 females, there were 86.9 males. For every 100 females age 18 and over, there were 86.9 males.

The median income for a household in the CDP was $59,663, and the median income for a family was $62,702. Males had a median income of $53,396 versus $24,688 for females. The per capita income for the CDP was $22,875. About 1.4% of families and 3.4% of the population were below the poverty line, including 1.7% of those under age 18 and 14.7% of those age 65 or over.

Education

For grades K through 6, public school students attend the schools of the Stafford Township School District. For grades 7 through 12, students attend the schools of the Southern Regional School District.

Students also have the option of attending The Marine Academy of Technology and Environmental Sciences (MATES) which is a specialized high school focusing on marine and environmental sciences.

St. Mary Academy, a K-8 school of the Roman Catholic Diocese of Trenton, is in Stafford Township, near Manahawkin CDP. It is managed by St. Mary Church of Barnegat. From 1997, until 2019 it operated as All Saints Regional Catholic School and was collectively managed by five churches. In 2019 St. Mary took entire control of the school, which remained on the same Manahawkin campus, and changed its name. The other churches no longer operate the school but still may send students there.

Transportation
NJ Transit provides bus service to Atlantic City on the 559 bus route.

Media
The Asbury Park Press and The Press of Atlantic City provide daily news coverage of the township, as does WOBM-FM radio. The township provides material and commentary to The Southern Ocean Times, which also serves Barnegat Township, Lacey Township, Long Beach Island, Ocean Township (Waretown) and Tuckerton as one of seven weekly papers from Micromedia Publications.

Notable people

People who were born in, residents of, or otherwise closely associated with Manahawkin include:
 Glenn Carson (born 1990), American football linebacker who played in the NFL for the Arizona Cardinals.
 Doc Cramer (1905–1990), center fielder who played for four American League teams from 1929 to 1948.
 Mike Gesicki (born 1995), tight end who plays for the Miami Dolphins team.
 Clark Harris (born 1984), long snapper for the Cincinnati Bengals who played college football at Rutgers University.
 William A. Newell (1817–1901), Governor of New Jersey who represented the state in the United States House of Representatives.
 Ethan Vanacore-Decker (born 1994), professional soccer player for the Union Omaha in the United Soccer League.

References

External links

 Nautical chart of Manahawkin Bay

Census-designated places in Ocean County, New Jersey
Populated places in the Pine Barrens (New Jersey)
Stafford Township, New Jersey